The 1957 Pacific typhoon season has no official bounds; it ran year-round in 1957, but most tropical cyclones tend to form in the northwestern Pacific Ocean between June and December. These dates conventionally delimit the period of each year when most tropical cyclones form in the northwestern Pacific Ocean.

The scope of this article is limited to the Pacific Ocean, north of the equator and west of the International Date Line. Storms that form east of the date line and north of the equator are called hurricanes; see 1957 Pacific hurricane season. Tropical storms formed in the entire west Pacific basin were assigned a name by the Fleet Weather Center on Guam.

Systems 

Twenty-two tropical storms developed in 1957 in the Northwestern Pacific. Tropical depressions were likely, but no records are known to exist that would mention any. Eighteen storms reached typhoon intensity, of which 8 reached super typhoon strength. An additional storm, Della, came across the Dateline from the Central Pacific, therefore it is not taken account in the total number of storms.

Tropical Storm 01W 

The first tropical cyclone of the 1957 season, classified as Tropical Storm 01W by the JTWC, was initially identified early on January 3 as a tropical depression over open waters east of the Philippines. Within several hours, the system intensified into a tropical storm as it tracked west-northwestward. Tropical Storm 01W maintained this intensity through January 5 before abruptly weakening to a tropical depression near the eastern Philippines. The system made landfall in eastern Leyte early on January 6 with winds of  before dissipating the following day over Romblon.

Typhoon Rose 

About two weeks after Tropical Storm 01W dissipated over the Philippines, a new tropical depression formed to the southeast of Guam on January 21. Gradual intensification took place as the depression tracked westward. Rose maintained this intensity for roughly 24 hours before undergoing a brief period of rapid intensification, attaining winds of  early on January 23. For most of the day, the now Category 2 typhoon, strengthened at a more modest rate before undergoing a second brief period of rapid intensification. Upon attaining this intensity, Rose became the most intense January typhoon on record, surpassing that of Super Typhoon Karen in 1948.

After attaining its peak intensity, Rose began to take a more northerly track and weakened. Late on January 25, Rose rapidly weakened to a low-end typhoon and by January 26, the system had further weakened to a tropical storm. However, the JMA continued monitoring the remnants of Rose as it turned sharply eastward over open waters. During the afternoon of January 28, the depression nearly stalled as it turned northward before accelerating and losing its identity south of Japan on January 30.

Typhoon Shirley 

Shirley formed on April 11 east of the Philippines. It moved north and intensified to its brief peak of  winds and a pressure of 975 mbar on April 15. Shirley then turned to the northwest and weakened to a tropical storm on April 16. Shirley turned to the west and dissipated on April 18 near the northern end of Luzon.

Typhoon Trix 

Trix formed on May 2 near the Marshall Islands. Trix turned to the north on May 9 and to the east-northeast on May 10, weakening to a Category 2 typhoon on May 11. Trix continued to move northeast and weakened to a Category 1 typhoon on May 13. It dissipated on May 17 just over the Date Line without affecting any land.

Typhoon Virginia 

Virginia formed on June 18 in the open western Pacific east of the southern Philippines. It moved west and strengthened to a typhoon on June 20 and reached its peak of and a minimum central pressure of 900 mbar on June 22. Virginia then began to move northwest and weakened to a Category 4 typhoon as it passed east of Luzon on June 23 and June 24. Virginia then continued to move north and then northeast until its dissipation on June 28.

Virginia was an early season typhoon. It destroyed 1,000 buildings and killed 86 people as it sliced through Taiwan and southern Japan. The storm left $20 million (1957 USD) in damage.

Typhoon Wendy 

Wendy formed on July 10, and took a western path. It was projected to make landfall in the Philippines, which it did do on July 14 with 105 mph winds and a pressure of 985 mbar. After landfall, it weakened to a category one typhoon, but restrengthened after reaching the Pacific Ocean again. It battered Hong Kong when it struck it on July 16. When typhoon Wendy initially hit, it injured 8 people, killed 8 people, and 1 was missing but as it continued to pass on the death toll raised to 16.

Typhoon Agnes 

On August 12, the seventh storm of the season formed. Agnes moved in an erratic northern direction until August 16, when it briefly turned to the northwest toward China. Agnes then began to curve towards the north, passing over one of the Ryukyu Islands with 155 mph winds and a minimum central pressure of 905 mbar. After it passed over the islands, Agnes weakened to tropical storm strength. On August 21, South Korea was struck by a 50 mph Agnes; their 1st tropical cyclone of the season. It passed over the peninsula and briefly was over water before it hit Russia with 45 mph winds. Agnes became extratropical the next day over southern Russia. Its extratropical form continued for two more days until it dissipated in the center of the Sea of Okhotsk.

Tropical Storm 08W 

08W formed on August 15, becoming the 8th of the season. It moved in a generally westward direction for a couple days until it struck Hainan on August 18 with 65 mph winds and a minimum pressure of 984 mbar. It moved south over land, retaining its strength. It soon moved north again, but suddenly turned southwest for a brief time before it returned to its original path. It weakened to a tropical depression on August 20 and struck mainland China later that day. It almost became extratropical almost at the same time. Ex-08W lingered northeast until the 24th, when the last of it was gone after ten days in existence.

JMA Tropical Storm Nine 

A disturbance close to Japan's coast developed into a tropical depression on August 22, and became a tropical storm 6 hours later. It managed to achieve a minimum central pressure of 999 mbar before it struck the southeastern portion of Japan. It weakened to a tropical depression shortly before landfall though, and became extratropical the next day. But its extratropical remnants continued to move north-northeast, then northeast, and then east-northeast until it dissipated on August 27.

Typhoon Bess 

Bess formed on August 26 close to the Marshall Islands. After moving westward, Bess attained Category 3 status with 115 mph winds a pressure of 950 mbar. It hit southern Japan on September 6 and later became extratropical over water on September 9. But the extratropical form of Bess continued east for one more day before it became disorganized enough to be declared dissipated.

After communication was restored, officials on the island stated that there was likely no loss of life as a result of the storm. Little damage also took place throughout Iwo Jima.

Along coastal regions, waves exceeding  caused significant coastal damage. In Kyushu, at least six people were killed, 14 others listed as missing and 28 more injured as a result of Bess. According to police reports, 912 homes were destroyed and 1,522 others were severely damaged by flooding and landslides triggered by Typhoon Bess. An additional 2,510 homes sustained minor damage. Throughout Japan, an estimated 24,000 people were left homeless in the wake of the storm. In all, at least 20 people were killed as a result of Bess in Japan.

Typhoon Carmen 

Carmen formed on September 9 north-northeast of the Philippines. It slowly moved north and the west over the course of three days, until it strengthened to a tropical storm. Carmen headed south briefly before heading east-northeast, when it began to strengthen even more. Carmen reached winds of 125 mph and a pressure of 960 mbar. But shortly thereafter, the strengthening stopped, and it slowly weakened. On September 15, Carmen made landfall in southern China and dissipated the following day.

Typhoon Della 

A disturbance in the Intertropical Convergence Zone developed into Tropical Storm Della on September 1. Della moved west-northwestward, strengthening to a hurricane while west of Hawaii. There, it brought heavy surf to the western islands. The hurricane continued generally westward, moving to the southwest while crossing the International Date Line. It turned westward and the northwestward. During its long northwestward trek, Della reached its peak intensity of 140 mph and a minimum central pressure of ≤960 mbar. On September 14, Della began to travel a completely opposite direction-northeast. It continued that direction for a number of days, until it reached the Dateline as a 70 mph tropical storm. As the storm was crossing the date line, it turned sharply to the north-northeast. A few days later, Della turned east-northeast and dissipated on September 18.

Typhoon Elaine 

On September 14, in the open Pacific, Elaine was formed. It moved in a generally northwestward direction while gaining strength. Its peak intensity was 140 mph and a pressure of 945 mbar. But it turned sharply to the northeast and lost strength. On its penultimate day as a tropical cyclone, it turned eastward and became extratropical the next day. Elaine's extratropical form continued one more day, and dissipated, one week since its formation, just over the Dateline.

Typhoon Faye 

Faye formed on September 18. After weakening, it struck Okinawa as a Category 2  typhoon; Faye battered the island, which was still recovering from Typhoon Emma that struck the same area a year ago. 53 people died in its wake, while 79 were listed as missing. Faye also left damages, straining the expensive budget caused by past and future typhoons that struck the island. Faye passed over the Date Line and shortly after became extratropical on the last day of the month, but continued one more day as an extratropical system before it met its demise.

Typhoon Gloria 
Gloria formed on September 17. After crossing the Philippines as a category two, it brought hurricane winds to Hong Kong and strong winds to Macau. After landfall, it moved east and met its demise on September 24. It had a minimum central pressure of 980 mbar and maximum winds of 105 mph.

Typhoon Hester 
Hester formed on October 3, several hundred miles east of the Philippines. At first, it slowly intensified, then rapid intensification occurred, reaching its peak strength of 150 mph while southeast of Japan. It then gradually weakened, weakening to a tropical storm southeast of the Kamchatka Peninsula. It then further weakened, dissipating just north of the Aleutian Islands.

Typhoon Irma 

Irma formed on October 9, west of the Philippines. The tropical cyclone strengthened to a category one typhoon with maximum sustained winds of 85 mph and a minimum central pressure 990 mbar. It moved west, and hit Vietnam with 80 mph winds and a minimum central pressure of 995 mbar. It dissipated on October 13, over the Thailand–Laos border.

Typhoon Irma brought torrential rains and high winds to Vietnam, resulting in nine fatalities and an estimated $2 million in damage.

Tropical Storm 17W 

Tropical Storm 17W formed on October 11. Later, it hit the Philippines as a tropical depression once, then again as a tropical depression, but actually strengthened to tropical storm strength while over land. It continued west-northwest until it struck China. It dissipated around the same moment it made landfall on October 15. 16W had maximum sustained winds of 50 mph and a minimum central pressure of 1000 mbar.

Typhoon Judy 

Judy formed on October 19, in the open Pacific. It moved westward and strengthened into a super typhoon with maximum sustained winds of 150 mph and a minimum central pressure of 960 mbar. It then began to curve north, therefore weakening. Judy passed by Japan, but far away enough to avoid damage. Soon after that, it began to move east and then east-northeast as a tropical storm. Judy dissipated on October 30, just over the Date Line.

Typhoon Kit 

On November 6, Kit formed in the same general area as Super Typhoon Judy did. It moved westward and slowly strengthened. But after reaching tropical storm-strength, Kit's intensification rapidly quickened. It briefly became a category five super typhoon with maximum sustained winds of 160 mph and a minimum central pressure of 910 mbar. After weakening slightly, Kit struck the northern Philippines as a Category 4 on November 11. After exiting land, Kit restrengthened into a Category 1 . It became extratropical on November 17 and dissipated shortly thereafter.

Torrential rains and high winds impacted much of northern Luzon, Philippines during a country-wide election. Nearly half of the 7.2 million people expected to vote were effected by the typhoon. Severe property damage took place and at least 19 people were killed in the country as a result of the storm. Thousands of people were also left homeless in the wake of the typhoon.

Typhoon Lola 

Lola formed on November 7 in the open Pacific. It moved west for a while before it shifted to a more northern position. It was shortly after that Lola had maximum sustained winds of 185 mph and a minimum central pressure of 900 mbar. Then Lola weakened and slowly curved east. It weakened to a tropical storm, then back to category one. But Lola was too far north to retain the strength and weakened even more. Lola dissipated on November 22, well over the Dateline. At some point, Lola hit Guam and caused areas in Merizo to flood four to five feet. In addition, damage was recorded in the Bikini Atoll after Lola passed near Kili Island. Crops were destroyed and the island's supply ship was sunk.

Typhoon Mamie 

On November 17, Tropical Storm Mamie developed over the open Pacific Ocean, in a way similar to Typhoon Lola's formation, but moved northwest instead. As soon as Mamie began to curved north, it attained its maximum sustained winds of 125 mph and minimum central pressure of 960 mbar. But then it moved east-northeast and rapidly weakened. Mamie moved north and became extratropical on November 24, and dissipated on November 25.

Season statistics

Impact 
This table summarizes the death toll for selected cyclones. This table is restricted to storms that threatened land only. The color behind the date and location of landfall indicates its strength at that landfall or near miss.

Storm names 
The names use are the same as when they were last used, except for Virginia and Wendy, which replaced Vae and Wilma.

One eastern Pacific storm, Hurricane Della, crossed into this basin. It became Typhoon Della, keeping its original name (even though its name was from the West Pacific list) and "C" suffix. In addition, Hurricane Nina formed in the Central Pacific, and remained in the basin. It received a name on the West Pacific list; but doesn't count as part of the 1957 Pacific typhoon season.

See also 

 List of Pacific typhoon seasons
 1957 Atlantic hurricane season
 1957 Pacific hurricane season
 Australian region cyclone seasons: 1956–57 1957–58
 South Pacific cyclone seasons: 1956–57 1957–58
 South-West Indian Ocean cyclone seasons: 1956–57 1957–58

References

External links 
 Japan Meteorological Agency
 Joint Typhoon Warning Center .
 China Meteorological Agency
 National Weather Service Guam
 Hong Kong Observatory
 Macau Meteorological Geophysical Services
 Korea Meteorological Agency
 Philippine Atmospheric, Geophysical and Astronomical Services Administration
 Taiwan Central Weather Bureau
 Digital Typhoon - Typhoon Images and Information
 Typhoon2000 Philippine typhoon website